Herman Charles Hoskier (1864–1938), was a biblical scholar, British textual critic, and son of a merchant banker, Herman Hoskier (1832–1904).

Hoskier, as textual critic, generally but not entirely supported the Byzantine text-type against the Alexandrian text-type. He compared, in Codex B and It Allies, the text of Codex Vaticanus with Codex Sinaiticus, and showed how many significant disagreements the best witnesses of the Alexandrian text have. Hoskier attempted to demonstrate that Vaticanus presents a text which has been conformed to the Coptic versions. Hoskier also compared the text of Minuscule 700 with the Textus Receptus, where he noted 2724 differences between the two.

Hoskier collated every known Greek manuscript of the Apocalypse up to 1918. This took 30 years. The result of this work was published in 1929 (Concerning the Text of the Apocalypse). Hoskier shows parallels between Papyrus 46 and the Ethiopic Version in the Pauline epistles.

Works 
 
 Concerning the Genesis of the Versions of the New Testament (1910) (2 vols.)
 The golden Latin Gospels in the library of J. Pierpont Morgan (1910).
 Concerning the date of the Bohairic Version (1911)
 Collation of Codex 157 (ROME. VAT. URB. 2) JTS (1913)
 The Lost Commentary of Oecumenius on the Apocalypse (1913)
 Codex B and Its Allies, a study and an indictment, Bernard Quaritch (London 1914). (Volume 1–Volume 2)
 The text of Codex Usserianus 2., or2 (microform) ("Garland of Howth") with critical notes to supplement and correct the collation of the late T. K. Abbott, Bernard Quaritch (London 1919) 
 Immortality (The Daniel Company, 1925).
 The Complete Commentary of Oecumenius on the Apocalypse. 1928.
  vol. I
 The Bronze Horses (The Mosher press, 1930).
 What is Nirvana? (The Mosher press, 1930).
 In Tune with the Universe (London: Rider & Co.,1932).
 The back of beyond (The Daniel Company, 1934).
 A commentary on the various readings in the text of the epistle to the Hebrews in the Chester-Beatty Papyrus P46 (circa 200 A.D.), Bernard Quaritch, (London 1938)

See also 
 Differences between codices Sinaiticus and Vaticanus

References

External links 
 Codex B and Its Allies (Part I)
 Codex B and Its Allies (Part II)
 

1864 births
1938 deaths
British theologians
British biblical scholars
New Testament scholars